Kazimieras Motieka (12 November 1929 in Kaunas – 31 August 2021) was a Lithuanian politician and lawyer. In 1990 he was among those who signed the Act of the Re-Establishment of the State of Lithuania.

He studied law in the graduate studies at the Law Faculty of Vilnius University. Motieka was Attorney at law at the law firm Motieka and Audzevičius.

References

External links
Law company in Lithuania
 Website of the Law firm  "Motieka ir Audzevičius"

1929 births
2021 deaths
Members of the Seimas
Politicians from Kaunas
Vilnius University alumni
20th-century Lithuanian lawyers
21st-century Lithuanian lawyers